The cloaked minor (Mesoligia furuncula) is a moth of the family Noctuoidea. It is found in the Palearctic realm (Europe, northwest Africa, Russia, Siberia, Japan, north Iran, Afghanistan, and China (Qinghai and Shaanxi).

Description
The wingspan is 22–28 mm. The length of the forewings is 10–12 mm. The typical form has the forewing sharply demarcated between a pale distal field and a rufous basal field. The colour and pattern is highly variable and furuncula may look like a lot of the species in the genus Oligia which can be separated by from all but Mesoligia literosa by details of the genitalia. A study of the genitalia of European and Asian specimens of the two Mesoligia species literosa Haworth and furuncula Denis & Schiffermüller showed however that there is no significant intra-specific variation, in these two closely related Oligia species.

Biology
The moth flies in one generation from late June to mid September .

The larvae feed on various grasses such as Tufted Hair-grass, Festuca ovina, and Arrhenatherum elatius.

Notes
The flight season refers to Belgium and The Netherlands. This may vary in other parts of the range.

References

External links

Cloaked Minor at UKmoths
Funet Taxonomy
Lepiforum.de Includes photograph of genitalia
Vlindernet.nl 

Hadeninae
Moths described in 1775
Moths of Africa
Moths of Asia
Moths of Europe
Moths of Japan
Insects of Turkey
Taxa named by Michael Denis
Taxa named by Ignaz Schiffermüller